is a Japanese footballer currently playing as a midfielder for Oita Trinita.

Club career
Goto made his professional debut for Oita Trinita in a 2–1 Emperor's Cup win against Thespakusatsu Gunma.

Career statistics

Club
.

Notes

References

External links

2004 births
Living people
Japanese footballers
Association football midfielders
Oita Trinita players